Atanasia Ionescu (later Albu, 19 March 1935 – 1990) was a Romanian artistic gymnast. She competed at the 1958 World Championships and 1960 and 1964 Olympics and won team bronze medals in 1958 and 1960. After retiring from competitions she worked as a gymnastics coach and international referee.

References

External links 
 
 
 

1935 births
1990 deaths
Romanian female artistic gymnasts
Gymnasts at the 1960 Summer Olympics
Gymnasts at the 1964 Summer Olympics
Olympic bronze medalists for Romania
Olympic gymnasts of Romania
Medalists at the World Artistic Gymnastics Championships
Olympic medalists in gymnastics
Medalists at the 1960 Summer Olympics
20th-century Romanian women